Chernovka is a rural locality (a village) in Azikeyevsky Selsoviet, Beloretsky District, Bashkortostan, Russia. The population was 126 as of 2010. There are 7 streets.

Geography 
Chernovka is located 12 km west of Beloretsk (the district's administrative centre) by road. Beloretsk is the nearest rural locality.

References 

Rural localities in Beloretsky District